The Golden Contract is a professional boxing tournament created by boxing management and promotions company MTK Global. The tournament is held across three weight-classes with eight fighters in each class, competing in 10 x 3 minute rounds. The winners of each tournament secure a two-year, five-fight contract with MTK Global that guarantees a six-figure purse for each fight. The tournament is televised live on Sky Sports in the United Kingdom and streamed through ESPN+ in the United States.

2019/2020
The Golden Contract's inaugural tournament is being contested across the featherweight, super-lightweight and light-heavyweight divisions.

Featherweight

Competitors in the featherweight edition are; Britain's Ryan Walsh, Leigh Wood, Jazza Dickens and Tyrone McCullagh; Ireland's David Oliver Joyce; Mexico's Carlos Araujo; Spain's Carlos Ramos; and Hairon Socarras of Cuba. With Britain's Razaq Najib and Jacob Robinson in reserve. The quarter-final bouts took place on 4 October 2019 at the York Hall, London, and the semi-finals on 21 February 2020 at the same venue. The final was originally set to take place in June, however, due to the COVID-19 pandemic the date was pushed back to 30 September.

Super-lightweight
Competitors in the super-lightweight edition are; Britain's Tyrone McKenna, Ohara Davies, Jeff Ofori, Darren Surtees, Kieran Gething and Mikey Sakyi; America's Logan Yoon; and France's Mohamed Mimoune. The quarter-final bouts took place on 22 November 2019 at the York Hall, London, and the semi-finals on 21 February 2020. The final was originally set to take place in June, however, due to the COVID-19 pandemic the date was pushed back to 30 September.

Light-heavyweight
Competitors in the light-heavyweight edition are; Britain's Hosea Burton, Steven Ward, Liam Conroy, Tommy Philbin, Andre Sterling and Bob Ajisafe; Germany's Serge Michel; and Latvia's Ričards Bolotņiks. The quarter-final bouts took place on 14 December 2019 at the Brentwood Centre, Brentwood. The semi-finals were originally scheduled to take place on 20 March 2020 at the York Hall in London, however, due to the COVID-19 pandemic the event was rescheduled to take place in September, being split over two nights; the first bout, featuring Bolotniks, took place in Bolotniks' hometown of Rīga, Latvia, on 26 September; the second bout will take place on the same card as the featherweight and super-lightweight finals on 30 September at the York Hall in London.

References

External links
MTK Global official website

British sports television series
Sports competition series
Boxing competitions
Sky UK original programming
Recurring sporting events established in 2019
2019 in British sport
2020 in British sport
2019 sports events in London
2020 sports events in London
2019 in boxing
2020 in boxing